is a Japanese television series which premiered on Fuji TV in October 2011. It starred Japanese actor Hidetoshi Nishijima and Korean actress Kim Tae-hee.

Plot
In the romantic comedy, quiet Japanese security guard Namiki Kohei (Hidetoshi Nishijima), whose only real interest seems to be astronomy, is ordered to bodyguard top Korean actress Han Yoo-Na (Kim Tae-hee) at an exceptional production set in Japan.

Kohei is a single man approaching his 40s who has a part-time job at a security company. He has a sweet and handsome appearance, of which some people take advantage.  Easily swayed by those around him, Kohei often takes care of his sister's three kids because of her habit of taking off to exotic locations in pursuit of various short-lived relationships. Still, he is a passionate man and dreams of finding his star. But because of his family and economic situation, he can't follow through on those dreams.

One day, Kohei is assigned as security for Han Yoo-Na for a period of 99 days. Yoo-Na is a pure and kind person. Even though she appears nearly perfect and very stylish, she prefers to act like a normal person. She enjoys eating simple Japanese food and on the film set Yoo-Na tries to take time out of her busy schedule to help others. She seems to be envied by all, but actually feels lonely due to being an idol who is supposed to keep her distance from others.  Unknown to others, she has a sad secret and this, as well as her desire to try out different foods while she is in Japan, causes her to escape her hotel at night, leading to various escapades as Kohei has to retrieve her and escort her back to the hotel. These escapades regularly land Kohei in trouble.

At first, Kohei and Yoo-Na don't seem to get along due to his somewhat clumsy behavior and because his responsibility for keeping her out of trouble conflicts with her wish for some freedom. But as the deadline of 99 days approaches, their relationship undergoes some changes.

Cast
 Hidetoshi Nishijima as Kohei Namiki, a clumsy and therefore accident prone security guard whose only real interest seems to be astronomy. His dream is to find and name a previously unknown star.
 Kim Tae-hee as Han Yoo-na, a top Korean actress.
 Nanami Sakuraba as Momo, Kohei’s older niece, a high school student who wants to become a dancer.
 Taecyeon as Tae-sung, a mysterious young Korean（Yoo-na's long lost younger brother, from whom she was separated when their parents divorced very early）
 Jun Kaname as Kazuya, a wily paparazzi reporter
 Hideo Ishiguro as Tamotsu Kondou, Kohei’s co-worker
 Mitsuko Baisho as Emiko Saegusa, Kohei’s boss and long-time friend of Naoko Serizawa
 Mayumi Asaka as Naoko Serizawa, Yoo-na’s manager
 Hanae Kan as Chun Hi-Jin, Yoo-na’s assistant
 Tomoko Ikuta as Yukiko Namiki, Kohei’s flighty sister and mother of Momo, Sumire and Ren
 Kuranosuke Sasaki as Yamato Takanabe, Yoo-na’s co-star and long ago schoolmate of Kohei, when he was overweight and known as Ganmo, something he wants to hide. Self-regarding and infatuated with Yoo-na, who respects him as an actor but has no romantic interest in him
 Yuki Furukawa as Sumiyoshi Natsume, Takanabe’s assistant, who falls for his counterpart Hi-jun
 Ai Kato as Kumada Kozue, a friend of Kohei who works at the observatory where Kohei aspires to work (Ep. 6, 8-9)
 Uwa Ishibashi and Shoma Suginomori as the children Sumire and Ren Namiki, Kohei’s niece and nephew

Production
Boku to Star no 99 Nichi was first announced by Fuji TV on August 25, 2011. The main cast for this television series was also revealed to be actor Hidetoshi Nishijima and Korean actress Kim Tae-hee. Kim had previously starred in the popular Korean television series IRIS, but this was her first role in a Japanese television series. This role also required her to speak most of her lines in Japanese, which she was able to do fluently with a light Korean accent. Boku to Star no 99 Nichi was also Nishijima's first lead role in a television drama aired on one of the commercial television networks in Japan. He previously starred in the television drama series School!! which was aired in January 2011 in the same drama time slot.

Nanami Sakuraba was announced as one of this television series' additional cast members on September 8, 2011. She played the role of Kohei's niece, a high school student who has to care for her younger siblings in place of her absent mother. She dreams of becoming a dancer but gets no recognition for her dancing.

On September 29, 2011, it was announced that singer Taecyeon and actor Jun Kaname would star in this television series. Taecyeon, who is a member of the K-pop group 2PM, played his first regular role in a Japanese television series. He previously appeared in one episode of the Japanese television series BOSS. His role in the television series was not announced but he played Kim Tae-hee’s long lost younger brother. Actor Jun Kaname played the role of a paparazzi reporter in this television series.

Episodes

International broadcast
  Thailand: Channel 7 - aired beginning March 6, 2014, on Wednesdays to Fridays.
  - WakuWaku Japan - Began airing in October 2016 with English subtitles.
  - WakuWaku Japan - Began airing April 11, 2017, on Tuesdays with English and Indonesian subtitles.
  - WakuWaku Japan - Began airing April 3, 2017, on Mondays with Chinese subtitles.

References

External links
  

Japanese drama television series
2011 Japanese television series debuts
2011 Japanese television series endings
Japanese romance television series
Fuji TV dramas